Francesco Bandini Piccolomini (1505–1588) was a Roman Catholic prelate who served as Archbishop of Siena (1529–1588).

Biography
Francesco Bandini Piccolomini was born in 1505.
On 7 April 1529, he was appointed during the papacy of Pope Clement VII as Archbishop of Siena.
On 25 October 1538, he was consecrated bishop. 
He served as Archbishop of Siena until his death in 1588.

References

External links and additional sources
 (for Chronology of Bishops) 
 (for Chronology of Bishops) 

16th-century Italian Roman Catholic archbishops
Bishops appointed by Pope Clement VII
1505 births
1588 deaths
House of Piccolomini